Ronald Leonard "Bucky" Buchanan (born November 15, 1944 in Montreal, Quebec) is a Canadian former professional ice hockey centre who played extensively in the World Hockey Association and briefly in the National Hockey League between 1966 and 1976.

Biography
Buchanan was a member of the Oshawa Generals for three seasons, playing on teams that included Bobby Orr and Wayne Cashman.  Buchanan went on to play for the Boston Bruins and St. Louis Blues of the NHL and the Cleveland Crusaders, Edmonton Oilers and Indianapolis Racers of the WHA.

Buchanan played the majority of his career with teams in the minor professional leagues (AHL, CPHL/CHL, WHL).

After his retirement from playing, Buchanan was briefly the head coach of the Los Angeles Blades of the minor-pro Pacific Hockey League.

Buchanan's father, Ralph Buchanan, was also a professional hockey player, and had played two games for the New York Rangers in the 1948–49 NHL season.

Career statistics

Regular season and playoffs

External links

1944 births
Living people
Anglophone Quebec people
Boston Bruins players
Buffalo Bisons (AHL) players
Canadian ice hockey centres
Cleveland Crusaders players
Denver Spurs (WHL) players
Edmonton Oilers (WHA) players
Ice hockey people from Montreal
Indianapolis Racers players
Kansas City Blues players
Minneapolis Bruins players
Oklahoma City Blazers (1965–1977) players
Oshawa Generals players
Quebec Aces (AHL) players
St. Louis Blues players